The Stanley Kubrick Archive is held by the University of the Arts London in their Archives and Special Collection Centre at the London College of Communication.  The Archive opened in October 2007 and contains material collected and owned by the film director Stanley Kubrick (1928–1999). It was transferred from his home in 2007 through a gift by his family. It contains much of Kubrick's working material that was accumulated during his lifetime.

The collection spans Kubrick's career as a photographer for Look and as a film director. His films are: Fear and Desire, Killer's Kiss, The Killing, Paths of Glory, Spartacus, Lolita, Dr. Strangelove or: How I Learned to Stop Worrying and Love the Bomb, 2001: A Space Odyssey, A Clockwork Orange, Barry Lyndon, The Shining, Full Metal Jacket and Eyes Wide Shut. Kubrick also planned to make a number of other films two in particular were abandoned just before production, Napoleon and The Aryan Papers. He also played an important role in the conception of AI: Artificial Intelligence, although it was completed after his death by Steven Spielberg.

The collection held by the university is made up of a range of material including  props, scripts, research, production paperwork such as call sheets, costumes and photographs for all his films and Look, as well as material for those projects that were conceived but never visualised. By maintaining a high degree of control in the film making process, Kubrick was able to retain material generated by his pioneering techniques, research and production work: arguably making this collection one of the most complete examples of film making practice worldwide.

Items from the archive are on loan for the touring Stanley Kubrick Exhibition.

References

External links 
 University of the Arts London Archives and Special Collections Centre
 Stanley Kubrick Archive on Archives Hub
 Stanley Kubrick archive at University of the Arts London
 Online exhibition of materials from the Stanley Kubrick Archive
 Archives Hub Feature on the Stanley Kubrick Archive 

Museums established in 2007
Archives in the London Borough of Newham
University of the Arts London
Libraries in the London Borough of Southwark
Film archives in the United Kingdom
Archives
Oral history